Catharina van Rennes (2 August 1858, Utrecht – 23 September 1940, Amsterdam) was a Dutch music educator, soprano singer and composer.

Van Rennes was the daughter of Jan van Rennes and Marianna Josepha de Jong. Among her tutors were Richard Hol and Johan Messchaert. She made a career as a singer in oratorios and was highly praised for her interpretations of Schumann Lieder. She was also known for vocal compositions. She composed and conducted a cantata for The International Alliance meeting of the women's suffrage movement held in Amsterdam in 1909 which was performed by the Queen's Royal Band.

Van Rennes established her own singing school and developed her own teaching technique. Like her contemporary Hendrika Tussenbroek, she is remembered today for some popular Dutch children's songs such as "" (Three little toddlers were sitting on a fence), a translation of a Kate Greenaway verse, and "" (Madonna child) as well as a religious song " (Children of one Father).

Works
Selected works include:
Lentetover, songs for children
Jong Holland, songs for children
Vocal quartets, Op. 24
Duets, Op. 59

References

External links

1858 births
1940 deaths
Dutch sopranos
19th-century classical composers
20th-century classical composers
Dutch women classical composers
Dutch classical composers
Dutch music educators
Musicians from Utrecht (city)
20th-century Dutch women singers
19th-century Dutch women singers
Women music educators
Composers for carillon
20th-century women composers
19th-century women composers